Greifswald – Demmin – Ostvorpommern was a constituency in Mecklenburg-Vorpommern for the elections to the German Bundestag from 1990 to 2013.

History 
The constituency was formed after German reunification for the 1990 Bundestag elections under the name Greifswald - Wolgast - Demmin and received the constituency number 268.

The constituency was last contested at the 2009 election after which the state lost one Member of the Bundestag.

The area of ​​the Greifswald – Demmin – Ostvorpommern constituency was divided into three new constituencies:

 Vorpommern-Rügen – Vorpommern-Greifswald I
 Mecklenburgische Seenplatte I – Vorpommern-Greifswald II
 Mecklenburg Lake District II - Rostock District III

Geography 
The constituency covered Greifswald, Demmin and Ostvorpommern district.

Members

Election results

2009 German federal election

References 

Defunct electoral districts in Mecklenburg-Western Pomerania
1990 establishments in Germany
Constituencies established in 1990
2013 disestablishments in Germany
Constituencies disestablished in 2013